Françoise Parturier (1919 – 12 August 1995) was a French writer and journalist. She was the first "symbolic" female candidate for the Académie française in 1970.

The daughter of a medical doctor, she was born in Paris and studied at the University of Paris. In 1947, she married Jean Gatichon. She began a career in journalism after World War II. From 1950 to 1951, Parturier taught contemporary literature in the United States. She was a regular contributor to Le Figaro from 1956 to 1975. Parturier wrote three books in partnership with Josette Raoul-Duval under the nom de plume "Nicole". In 1959, she began writing under her own name.

Parturier died at Neuilly at the age of 75.

Selected works 
 Les lions sont lâchés (1955) with Josette Raoul-Duval as "Nicole"; 1961 film
 L'Amant de cinq jours (1959); 1971 film
 Marianne m'a dit (1963)
 Lettre ouverte aux hommes (1968)
 L'Amour ? le plaisir ? (1968)
 Lettre ouverte aux femmes (1974)
 La Lettre d'Irlande (1979)
 Les Hauts de Ramatuelle (1983)

References 

1919 births
1995 deaths
French women journalists
20th-century French novelists
French women screenwriters
University of Paris alumni
20th-century French screenwriters
20th-century French women writers
French expatriates in the United States